Jacopo da Verona (1355 - after 1443) was an Italian painter. As his name suggests, he was born in Verona. His works include the frescoes of the San Michele Oratory in Padua.

References

Painters from Verona
14th-century Italian painters
15th-century Italian painters
1355 births
Year of death unknown